Abdar (also Romanized as Ābdār; also known as Udār) is a village in Sahandabad Rural District, Tekmeh Dash District, Bostanabad County, East Azerbaijan Province, Iran. At the 2006 census, its population was 68, in 13 families.

References 

Populated places in Bostanabad County